Nosherwan may refer to:
 Khosrow I  (501–579), known as Nosherwan, Sasanian king
 Nosherwan Khan (born 1994), Pakistani squash player
 Dara Nusserwanji Khurody (1906–1983), Indian dairy entrepreneur
 Darashaw Nosherwan Wadia (1883-1969), Indian geologist
 Jamsetji Nusserwanji Tata (1839–1904), Indian industrialist, founder of the Tata Group and Jamshedpur
Yazdi Naoshriwan Karanjia (born 1937), Indian theatre personality

See also
 Nausherwan-E-Adil, 1957 Indian film
 Anushirvan (disambiguation)